Richard Pemberton Bellamy, Viscount Bellamy of Haversham (1853–before 1936) is a fictional character in the ITV period drama Upstairs, Downstairs, that was originally broadcast for five series from 1971 to 1975. He was portrayed by David Langton. In the 2010 revival of Upstairs, Downstairs, Rose Buck refers to her late Master, Lord Richard Bellamy of Haversham, with the implication that Richard had died sometime between 1930 and 1936.

Early life

He was the youngest son of the parson of Burnham Trenton in Norfolk, Charles Bellamy, and his wife Hannah.  As a young man he won a scholarship to Cambridge University, where he excelled. Richard has an older brother named Arthur (John Nettleton), who bullied Richard as a child. In 1909 Arthur visits Richard, the two have a falling out and they never speak to each other again. He became a Conservative MP.

Marriage with Marjorie Talbot-Carey 

In 1880, he married the wealthy Lady Marjorie Talbot-Carey. They had two children, James and Elizabeth.

Relationship with Mary Stokes 

Richard Bellamy intervened on behalf of Mary Stokes (portrayed by Susan Penhaligon) in the sixth episode A Cry for Help. In 1906 Mary Stokes, arrives in service pregnant. She found herself pregnant after being sexually assaulted and raped by Myles Radford. He is the son of Mary's previous employer and Richard's powerful politician and family friend. Richard Bellamy takes pity on Mary and attempts to help her. But the Radfords refuse to take responsibility and the legal system proves ineffective. Richard finds himself threatened with legal action if he continues with his accusations against Radford and finds himself facing rumours that he was the father. Sir Geoffrey tells him to send Mary away, so she quits her job with the Bellamys. But she departs with a small gift of money from some of the servants

Affair with Countess de Ternay 

In Desirous of Change he also has an affair with a Vienna-born French Countess de Ternay (portrayed by Angela Browne), which ends on wistfully friendly terms when they both realize neither has the wealth that their public appearances imply.

Marriage with Virginia Hamilton
Following Lady Marjorie's death, he marries Virginia Hamilton (portrayed by Hannah Gordon), a war widow, in 1919. He first met her in late 1916 when he was a junior minister (Civil Lord) of the Admiralty. In the 1917 New Year Honours List) he is created Viscount Bellamy of Haversham and a Knight Grand Cross of the Order of St Michael and St George.

Bibliography
 John Hawkesworth, In My Lady's Chamber, Sphere Books Limited, 1973

Upstairs, Downstairs characters